Leif Granli (born 25 September 1909 in Hegra, died 17 March 1988) was a Norwegian politician for the Labour Party.

He was elected to the Norwegian Parliament from Nord-Trøndelag in 1945, and was re-elected on six occasions. From 1963 to 1965, while the fourth cabinet Gerhardsen held office, Granli was appointed Minister of Agriculture. During this period his seat in parliament was taken by Hans Mikal Solsem. Granli was later Vice President of the Storting from 1967 to 1972, and from 2 October 1972 to 30 September 1973 he was President of the Storting.

On the local level he was a member of the executive committee of Frol municipal council from 1933 to 1949, except for the years 1940–1945 during the German occupation of Norway, and later a member of Levanger municipality council from 1959 to 1967. His political career ended with the position of County Governor of Nord-Trøndelag, which he held from 1971 to 1979.

Outside politics he worked as a journalist in Arbeider-Avisen from 1937 to 1940, and was editor-in-chief of Hardanger Folkeblad from 1940 to 1941. From 1935 to 1940 he also worked as a farmer; he had no formal qualifications in the field of agriculture prior to becoming Minister of Agriculture.

References

1909 births
1988 deaths
Ministers of Agriculture and Food of Norway
Members of the Storting
Labour Party (Norway) politicians
Politicians from Nord-Trøndelag
County governors of Norway
Norwegian newspaper editors
20th-century Norwegian writers
Presidents of the Storting
Vice Presidents of the Storting
20th-century Norwegian politicians